Lebrun Samuel Constantine (25 May 1874 in Maraval, Trinidad – 5 January 1942 at Tunapuna, Trinidad) was a West Indian cricketer who toured England in 1900 and 1906 and was a regular member of the Trinidad team from 1893-94 to 1922-23. He was primarily a batsman. He often kept wicket but was also a useful occasional bowler. He was an overseer on a cocoa estate in Diego Martin.

He is best known as the father of Learie Constantine and is often known as Old Cons. Another son Elias was also a useful cricketer and his brother-in-law Victor Pascall also toured with the West Indies in 1923.

He was a member of both the 1900 and 1906 West Indies touring sides. He was second in the West Indies batting averages in 1900 and third in 1906 so was regarded as one of the successes of these tours. In 1900 he scored the first century by a West Indian in England when he made 113 against the Gentlemen of the M.C.C., described by Wisden as "a dashing and faultless display". Before the 1906 tour he was described as "an excellent bat; considered to be Austin's rival, but his strokes lack the finish of Austin's" and "another of the brigade who proved himself very strong on the left side and can bat with power. He fields in the slips and can bowl right arm medium pace if required".

In the West Indies he was selected to play for the combined West Indian team against touring English teams on a number of occasions: in 1896-97, 1901-02, 1904-05 and 1912-13. He was a regular member of the Trinidad team playing a number of matches in the Inter-Colonial Tournament although only from the 4th tournament in 1899-1900. He scored his only first class century against British Guiana in the 10th tournament in 1909-10

He made his final appearance in an important match for Trinidad against Barbados in British Guiana at the age of 48 playing alongside his son Learie who had just turned 21.

References

External links
CricketArchive stats
Cricinfo player profile

Pre-1928 West Indies cricketers
Trinidad and Tobago cricketers
1874 births
1942 deaths